James Deon Lamont, also credited as J.D. Lamont, (born 15 June 1982) is a BAFTA and EMMY winning British screenwriter and producer known for his frequent writing collaborations with Jon Foster. and for writing the 'Paddington meets the Queen' sketch for the Platinum Jubilee

Career

Television & film work

James Lamont and Jon Foster are currently writing Paddington 3, after having worked on the two previous movies Paddington and Paddington 2.

In 2021 Lamont and Foster worked with Jimmy Fallon on the NBC special '5 More Sleeps 'Till Christmas' which was an adaptation of Fallon's book of the same title.

Alongside writing partner Foster, Lamont wrote the Cartoon Network animated series The Amazing World of Gumball' for which he won a BAFTA Children's Award in 2011 and 2012. '. They left the show shortly into the third season.

In 2019, he co-developed the animated television series The Adventures of Paddington along with Foster for which the pair won an EMMY. The show premiered on Gulli, M6, and Piwi+ in France, Nick Jr. in the UK, and Nickelodeon internationally and he will direct the third film with Foster.

In 2016 the pair wrote and created their own E4 sitcom 'WASTED' featuring Sean Bean 

Lamont and Foster wrote episodes for 'Cuckoo' a BBC sitcom featuring Greg Davies. 

In 2013 the pair wrote The Harry Hill Movie'', along with Harry Hill.

Online 
Lamont has written and performed for various online productions such as "Ted or Dead" for Channel Flip, "Dom Jolly's Joy Stick", Dawn Porter's Bad Girls Guides, "Ashen's Tech Dump", "Normal Activity", "Sleep Terrorist"  and "Big Noises". He worked on a 30-minute webisode for Kit Kat Chunky in 2012.

Awards 
Lamont, along with Jon Foster, won the 2011 and 2012 British Academy Children's Award for writing on The Amazing world of Gumball.

They also won the EMMY for The Adventures of Paddington

References

External links 

1982 births
Living people
English writers
English television writers
English screenwriters
English male screenwriters
British male television writers